Encephalartos bubalinus is a species of cycad in Kenya and Tanzania.

Description
Encephalartos bubalinus has an erect stem or, in more mature specimens, decombent, with a diameter of 35–45 cm and a height of up to 2 meters. 

The pinnate leaves, arranged in a crown at the apex of the stem, are 60 to 160 cm long and are composed of 50-90 pairs of leathery leaflets, arranged on the spine in an alternating manner, with an angle of 45 °, reduced with thorns near the petiole.

It is a dioecious species, with sessile male cones, 27.5–55 cm long and 13–5 cm in diameter and female cones 32-45 cm long and 20–25 cm in diameter, greenish in color.

The coarsely ovoid seeds, 30–40 mm long, are covered with a red-orange sarcotesta.

References

External links
 
 

bubalinus